is a Japanese prefectural university, located in Akita City, Japan.

History
Akita Prefectural University was established in 1999, annexing the Akita Prefectural Junior College of Agriculture (established in 1973), the same year. The university initially offered degrees in Systems like Technology, Biological and Environmental Science. In 2002, a graduate studies program was established.

Organization

Undergraduate
Systems Science and Technology Faculty (Honjo Campus)
Department of Mechanical and Intelligent Systems
Material Structural Engineering
 Thermal and Fluid Engineering
 Mechatronics and Bio-Mechanics
 Department of Electronics and Information Systems 
Electronic Systems Engineering 
Electronic Devices and Materials 
Information systems 
Department of Architecture and Environment Systems
Structure Laboratory (building construction science)
Materials Laboratory (Building Materials Science)
Environmental Laboratory (Environmental Planning Studies)
Planning Laboratory (architecture and urban amenities Group)
Management Systems Engineering
 Management Systems Engineering
Biological resources Sciences (Akita Campus, Ogata Campus)
Applied Biological Sciences
 Biological production Science
Biological and Environmental Sciences
Agribusiness

Graduate program
 Graduate School of Systems Science and Technology, 
Master's course
Mechanical and Intelligent Systems 
Electronics and Information Systems 
Architecture and Environment Systems 
Management Systems Engineering
Joint Life Cycle Engineering Design 
Doctoral Program
General Systems Science
Biological resources Sciences
Biological resources Sciences

Locations
Honjō Campus in Yurihonjō
Akita Campus, in Akita City
Ōgata Campus in Ōgata
Noshiro Advanced Wood Processing Institute in Noshiro

External links
 Official website 

Educational institutions established in 1999
Public universities in Japan
Universities and colleges in Akita Prefecture
1999 establishments in Japan
Buildings and structures in Akita (city)
Yurihonjō
Ōgata, Akita
Noshiro, Akita